John Edmund Hunt (November 25, 1908 – September 22, 1989) was an American Republican Party politician who represented New Jersey's 1st congressional district in the United States House of Representatives from 1967 to 1975.

Early life
Born in Lambertville, New Jersey on November 25, 1908, Hunt attended Newark Business School for three years.  He then went on to the New Jersey State Police Academy, Federal Bureau of Investigation National Academy, Harvard School of Police Science, and United States Army Intelligence School.  From 1942 to 1946, he served in the United States Army as the Combat Intelligence Officer with the 456th Bomb Group, where he earned a Bronze Star, Air Medal with two oak leaf clusters, Purple Heart, and a Presidential Unit Citation with oak leaf cluster.

Political career
Hunt's first elected position was as the sheriff of Gloucester County, from 1959 to 1963, when he was elected to the New Jersey Senate. From 1964 to 1966, he represented all of Gloucester County; from 1966 to January 1967, he represented the 1st Legislative District alongside Frank S. Farley. Hunt then served as the representative to New Jersey's 1st congressional district from January 3, 1967 to January 3, 1975.  He lost the 1974 election to future Governor of New Jersey, James Florio. Hunt tried to re-enter politics in the early 1980's by running for mayor of Pitman, NJ as a Republican.  The effort was unsuccessful with Hunt losing the election for mayor.

Hunt lived in Pitman, New Jersey until his death in Woodbury, New Jersey on September 22, 1989.

External links

John Edmund Hunt at The Political Graveyard

Reference List 

1908 births
1989 deaths
United States Army personnel of World War II
United States Army officers
Recipients of the Air Medal
Republican Party New Jersey state senators
New Jersey sheriffs
Harvard University alumni
People from Lambertville, New Jersey
People from Pitman, New Jersey
Politicians from Gloucester County, New Jersey
Republican Party members of the United States House of Representatives from New Jersey
20th-century American politicians
Military personnel from New Jersey